Joseph Ayo Babalola (25 April 1904 – 26 July 1959) was a Nigerian Christian minister and evangelist. He was the first General Evangelist of the Christ Apostolic Church, popularly called CAC in Nigeria. He was credited with healing powers.

Early life
Babalol a was born of Yoruba parents at Odo-Owa, in Kwara State. He was brought up as an Anglican. He attended elementary school at Oto-Awori on Badagry Road, Lagos State, in 1914. He reached standard four before he became a blacksmith's apprentice where he studied for two years. He then became a steamroller operator under the PWD (Public Works Department), then under the control of Great Britain.  After 15 days of training, he was able to drive without any assistance. After nine months; he became a master driver. A steamroller was first assigned to him on 1 April 1928 to work on the Osogbo – Ilesha road. On June 14, 1928, he transferred to Akure – Ilesha road. Babalola was baptized in Lagos lagoon in December 1929.

Ministry and healing 
In 1931 Faith Tabernacle affiliated with The Apostolic Church with general headquarters in the United Kingdom (not British Apostolic Church, as erroneously stated by some authors). Following a schism in The Apostolic Church around 1940, Babalola went with a  group led by Pastors J.B. Akinyele and D.O. Odubanjo to form an independent church, Christ Apostolic Church (CAC), where he continued his healing and evangelism until his death. 

The CAC regards Babalola as an apostle, although he was not ordained into that office. A CAC retreat center was built at Ipo Arakeji, Osun State where Babalola was called in 1928. However, Babalola was not the sole founder of CAC as many claim, but one of three founders.

The Christ Apostolic Church outlived Babalola and grew rapidly, with many churches under the CAC name. Each church has a specific branch name. Joseph Ayo Babalola University (JABU)  a private Nigerian university is located in Ipo Arakeji and Ikeji-Arakeji. Two neighbouring communities in Osun State, established by the Christ Apostolic Church Worldwide are named after him, located where he claimed he was called by God in 1928.

Death 
He was buried at Erekesan street at the Mausoleum in Efon Alaaye town in Ekiti state.

References

Further reading
Abi Olowe; Joseph Ayo Babalola Miracle Center, Omega Publishers, 2007
Toyin Falola; The History of Nigeria, Greenwood Press, 1999

1904 births
1959 deaths
Yoruba Christian clergy
Nigerian Pentecostals
People from Kwara State